Melanie Jane Davies,  (born 8 July 1961) is a British physician and academic, who specialises in type 2 diabetes mellitus. Since 2007, she has been Professor of Diabetes Medicine at the University of Leicester. She is the director of the National Institute for Health Research (NIHR) Leicester Biomedical Research Centre.

In the 2016 New Year Honours, she was appointed a Commander of the Order of the British Empire (CBE) "for services to diabetes research". In 2018, she was elected a Fellow of the Academy of Medical Sciences (FMedSci).

References

1961 births
Living people
British women medical doctors
British endocrinologists
Academics of the University of Leicester
Commanders of the Order of the British Empire
NIHR Senior Investigators